Grace Zumwinkle (born April 23, 1999) is an American women's ice hockey player for Minnesota. She represented the United States women's national ice hockey team at the 2022 Winter Olympics.

Playing career

NCAA
Zumwinkle began her collegiate career for the Minnesota Golden Gophers during the 2017–18 season. During her freshman year, she recorded 17 goals and 21 assists in 38 games to lead the team in scoring. She tied for the team lead with eight multi-point games. She was named the WCHA Rookie of the Week for the week ending December 12, 2017. She led all rookies with five points and recorded two goals and three assists in two games during the weekend. She was also named the WCHA Offensive Player of the Month for December 2017. In four games in December, she led all WCHA players with four goals and four assists, including one game-winning goal. Following an outstanding season, she was named to the All-WCHA First Team, WCHA All-Rookie team and WCHA Scoring Champion. She became the first freshman to be named WCHA Scoring Champion since 2010.

During the 2018–19 season, she ranked second on the team in scoring with 41 points in 39 games and led the team with six multi-goal games. She led Minnesota and ranked second in the WCHA with 25 goals, and led the WCHA and tied for second in the nation with seven power-play goals. She also ranked second in the WCHA with 0.64 goals per game and fifth in the WCHA with 1.05 points per game. On November 30, 2018, she recorded a career-high five points with her first career hat-trick and two assists in a game against Yale. She was subsequently named the WCHA Forward of the Week and NCAA Second Star of the Week for the week ending December 4, 2018. She was also named WCHA Forward of the Month for November 2018 after leading the league with seven goals and 11 points. She was named WCHA Forward of the Week for the week ending January 29, 2019, and she tied for the WCHA lead with four points and three goals over the weekend. She was also named WCHA Forward of the Month for January 2019 after leading the league with 12 points, eight goals, three power-play goals, and four power-play points during January.

During the 2019–20 season, she ranked second on the team with a career-high 45 points. She led the team, and ranked third in the WCHA with 25 goals, ranked second in the WCHA, and 10th in the nation with a +37 plus/minus rating. She was named WCHA Forward of the Week for the week ending October 29, 2019. She scored four of Minnesota's seven goals against Ohio State with a pair of two-goal games during the series. She also recorded her 50th career goal as a Gopher. The following week she was again WCHA Forward of the Week for the week ending November 5, 2019, after leading Minnesota with four points on two goals and two assists during the weekend series against the top-ranked Wisconsin Badgers. On November 16, 2019, she recorded her 100th career point with an assist in a game against Bemidji State. She became the 35th player in program history to reach the milestone. On February 29, 2020, she recorded her second career hat-trick in a game against St. Cloud State. She was subsequently named WCHA Forward of the Week for the week ending March 3, 2020. Following an outstanding season, she was named to the All-WCHA Second Team.

On July 14, 2021, she was named captain for the 2020–21 season. During her senior year she ranked third in the WCHA and eighth in the nation with 24 points, and second the WCHA and in the nation with 17 goals. She was named WCHA Forward of the Week for the week ending December 3, 2020. During the first four games of the season, she led the team with three goals and one assist. She was also named WCHA Forward of the Month for November 2020. On February 19, 2021, she recorded her third career hat trick in a game against Bemidji State. She was subsequently named WCHA Forward of the Week for the week ending February 23, 2021, her ninth WCHA weekly award. She was also named WCHA Forward of the Month for February 2021, her fifth WCHA monthly award. She led the WCHA with 11 points, seven goals, 28 shots on goal, and a +9 rating in six games during February. Following an outstanding season she was named All-WCHA First Team, AHCA All-America Second Team, All-USCHO Second Team, and a top-three finalist for the Patty Kazmaier Award.

International play
Zumwinkle represented the United States at the 2016 and 2017 IIHF World Women's U18 Championships, where she won gold.

On January 2, 2022, Zumwinkle was named to Team USA's roster to represent the United States at the 2022 Winter Olympics.

Personal life
Zumwinkle was born to Mike and Lori Zumwinkle. Her father played college football at St. John's University from 1982 to 1986, and her mother played tennis for College of Saint Benedict and Saint John's University from 1983 to 1987.

References

External links

1999 births
Living people
American women's ice hockey forwards
Ice hockey players from Minnesota
Ice hockey players at the 2022 Winter Olympics
Medalists at the 2022 Winter Olympics
Minnesota Golden Gophers women's ice hockey players
Olympic ice hockey players of the United States
Olympic silver medalists for the United States in ice hockey
People from Excelsior, Minnesota